Qingxiangping Subdistrict is a subdistrict in Xi District, Panzhihua, Sichuan, China. , it has six residential neighborhoods under its administration:
Yangjiaping Community
Dashuijing Community
Lubei Community
Lunan Community
Jinsha Community
Zhixue Community

See also 
 List of township-level divisions of Sichuan

References 

Township-level divisions of Sichuan
Panzhihua